Ramanand Yadav was an Indian politician. He was a Member of Parliament, representing Bihar in the Rajya Sabha (upper house) of India's Parliament as a member of the Indian National Congress.

References

Rajya Sabha members from Bihar
Indian National Congress politicians
1927 births
Possibly living people